Larium may refer to:

 Larium  a fossil genus of Brachiopoda, see List of brachiopod genera.
 A common misspelling of the drug name Lariam (Mefloquine).